Leonard Gershe (June 10, 1922 – March 9, 2002) was an American playwright, screenwriter, and lyricist.

Born in New York City, Gershe made his Broadway debut as a lyricist for the 1950 revue Alive and Kicking. He wrote the book for Harold Rome's musical stage adaptation of Destry Rides Again in 1959 and the play Butterflies Are Free in 1969. Later Gershe wrote the play Snacks for Tony Danza.

He wrote the lyrics for the "Born in a Trunk" sequence from the Judy Garland/James Mason musical A Star Is Born. In the 1950s, Gershe wrote 10 scripts for the Ann Sothern sitcom Private Secretary. He also wrote a number of episodes of The Lucy Show. His screen credits include Funny Face, 40 Carats, and Butterflies Are Free.

According to World of Wonder website writer Stephen Rutledge, Gershe had a long-term relationship with composer Roger Edens.

Gershe died in Beverly Hills, California from complications from a stroke. He was 79 and was buried at the Westwood Memorial Park in Los Angeles.

Nominations
 1958 Academy Award for Best Writing, Story and Screenplay, Written Directly for the Screen (Funny Face)
 1958 Writers Guild of America Award for Best American Musical (Funny Face)
 1973 Writers Guild of America Award for Best Comedy Adapted from Another Medium (Butterflies Are Free)
 1974 Writers Guild of America Award for Best Comedy Adapted from Another Medium (40 Carats)

References

External links

1922 births
2002 deaths
20th-century American dramatists and playwrights
American male screenwriters
American lyricists
Writers from New York City
Burials at Westwood Village Memorial Park Cemetery
American male dramatists and playwrights
Songwriters from New York (state)
American LGBT screenwriters
LGBT people from New York (state)
20th-century American male writers
Screenwriters from New York (state)
20th-century American screenwriters
20th-century American LGBT people
American LGBT dramatists and playwrights